Golda Meir (born Golda Mabovitch; 3 May 1898 – 8 December 1978) was an Israeli politician, teacher, and kibbutznikit who served as the fourth Prime Minister of Israel from 1969 to 1974. She was Israel's first and only female head of state, the first female head of state in the Middle East, and the fourth elected female head of state in the world. Meir also served as labor minister and foreign minister.

She has been described as the "Iron Lady" of Israeli politics. She had a reputation for being down-to-earth and a persuasive speaker. Her oratory skills and command of English made her an extremely successful fundraiser during the critical early years of the new Israeli state.

Born in Kyiv in the Russian Empire, Meir immigrated to Wisconsin, United States as a child with her family in 1906. She was educated there and eventually became a teacher. After getting married, she and her husband emigrated to Mandatory Palestine in 1921, settling on a kibbutz.

During her tenure as prime minister, Israel was caught off guard in the Yom Kippur War of 1973 and suffered severe losses in the first days of the war, before recovering and defeating the invading armies. Meir resigned the following year in response to public anger.

She died in 1978 of lymphoma.

Early life

Golda Mabovitch was born to a Jewish family in downtown Kyiv, Russian Empire (present-day Ukraine) on May 3, 1898 to Blume Neiditch (died 1951) and Moshe Mabovitch (died 1944), a carpenter. Meir wrote in her autobiography that her earliest memories were of her father boarding up the front door in response to rumours of an imminent pogrom. She had two sisters, Sheyna (born 1889) and Tzipke (born 1902), as well as five other siblings who died in childhood.

Meir's father, Moshe, left the country to find work in New York City in 1903. In his absence, the rest of the family moved to Pinsk (present-day Belarus) to join her mother's family. In 1905, Moshe moved to Milwaukee, Wisconsin, in search of higher-paying work, and found employment in the workshops of the local railroad yard. The following year, he had saved up enough money to bring his family to the United States. Golda along with her mother and sisters landed in Quebec and traveled to Milwaukee by train.

Meir's mother ran a grocery store on Milwaukee's north side. By age eight, Meir was often put in charge of watching the store when her mother went to buy supplies. She attended the Fourth Street Grade School (now Golda Meir School) from 1906 to 1912. A leader early on, she and a close friend, Regina Hamburger, organized the American Young Sisters Society, a fundraiser to pay for her classmates' textbooks in 1908. As part of the organization's activities, she rented a hall and scheduled a public meeting for the event. Despite frequent tardiness due to having to work in her mother's store, she graduated as valedictorian of her class.

In 1912, she began studying at North Division High School and worked part-time. Her employers included Schuster's department store and the Milwaukee Public Library. Her mother wanted Golda to leave school and marry, but she declined.

On 17 February 1913, Meir took a train to live with her married sister, Sheyna Korngold, in Denver, Colorado. There, Meir attended North High School. The Korngolds held intellectual evenings at their home, where Meir was exposed to debates on Zionism, literature, women's suffrage, trade unionism, and more. In her autobiography, she wrote: "To the extent that my own future convictions were shaped and given form  ... those talk-filled nights in Denver played a considerable role."

Around 1913, she began dating her future husband Morris Meyerson, a sign painter and socialist.

Return to Milwaukee, Zionist activism, and teaching

In 1914, after disagreements with her sister, Golda left North High School, moved out of her sister's home, and found work. After reconciling with her parents, she returned to Milwaukee and resumed studies at North Division High, graduating in 1915. While there, she became an active member of Young Poale Zion, which later became Habonim, the Labor Zionist youth movement. She spoke at public meetings and embraced Socialist Zionism.

She attended the teachers college Milwaukee State Normal School (now University of Wisconsin–Milwaukee) in 1916, and likely part of 1917. In 1917, she took a position at a Yiddish-speaking Folks Schule in Milwaukee. There, she further embraced Labor Zionism.

On 9 July 1917, Golda became a naturalized US citizen, as her father had naturalized, and at that time children of naturalized citizens under the age of 21 received citizenship by descent.

On 24 December 1917, Meir and Meyerson married. However, Meir's precondition for marriage was to settle in Palestine. She had intended to make aliyah straight away, but her plans were disrupted when all transatlantic passenger services were canceled due to the entry of the United States into the First World War. She then threw her energies into Poale Zion activities. A short time after their wedding, she embarked on a fund-raising campaign for Poale Zion that took her across the United States.

Immigration to Mandatory Palestine

In 1921, after the conclusion of the war, the couple moved to Palestine, then part of the British Mandate, along with Meir's sister Sheyna, Sheyna's daughter, and Meir's childhood friend Regina. They sailed on the SS Pocahontas, from New York to Naples, then from there to Tel Aviv by train. Meir's parents subsequently moved to Palestine in 1926.

They were eventually accepted into kibbutz Merhavia in the Jezreel Valley after an initial rejected application. Her duties included picking almonds, planting trees, working in the chicken coops, and running the kitchen. Recognizing her leadership abilities, the kibbutz chose her as its representative to the Histadrut, the General Federation of Labour.

In 1924, the couple left the kibbutz and lived briefly in Tel Aviv before settling in Jerusalem. There, they had two children: a son Menachem in 1924, and a daughter Sarah in 1926. Meir returned to Merhavia for a brief period in 1925.

Early political career
In 1928, Meir was elected secretary of Moetzet HaPoalot (Working Women's Council). She spent two years (1932–34) in the United States as an emissary for the organization and to get expert medical treatment for her daughter's kidney illness.

In 1934, when Meir returned from the United States, she joined the Executive Committee of the Histadrut and moved up the ranks to become the head of its Political Department. This appointment was important training for her future role in Israeli leadership.

In July 1938, Meir was the Jewish observer from Palestine at the Évian Conference, called by President Franklin D. Roosevelt of the United States to discuss the question of Jewish refugees' fleeing Nazi persecution. Delegates from the 32 invited countries repeatedly expressed their sorrow for the plight of the European Jews, but refused to admit the refugees. The only exception was the Dominican Republic, which pledged to accept 100,000 refugees on generous terms. Meir was disappointed at the outcome and she remarked to the press, "There is only one thing I hope to see before I die and that is that my people should not need expressions of sympathy anymore."

Throughout World War II, Meir served several key roles in the Jewish Agency, which functioned as the government of British Palestine.

In June 1946, Meir became acting head of the Political Department of the Jewish Agency after the British arrested Moshe Sharett and other leaders of the Yishuv as part of Operation Agatha. This was a critical moment in her career: she became the principal negotiator between the Jews in Palestine and the British Mandatory authorities. After his release, Sharett went to the United States to attend talks on the UN Partition Plan, leaving Meir to head the Political Department until the establishment of the state in 1948.

In 1947, she traveled to Cyprus to meet Jewish detainees of the Cyprus internment camps, who had been interred by the British after being caught trying to illegally enter Palestine, and persuade them to give priority to families with children to fill the small quota of detainees allowed into Palestine. She was largely successful in this task.

Role in the Palestine War and the establishment of Israel

On 17 November 1947, shortly before the outbreak of the 1947-1949 Palestine war, Meir met with King Abdullah I of Jordan. Abdullah I was seen as the only Arab leader willing to ally with a future Israeli state, as he also opposed the Mufti of Jerusalem and was rivals with other Arab countries. The meeting was cordial and confirmed that Abdullah was uninterested in invading and quietly willing to cooperate in future.

First phase of the war 

For most of the war, Meir reluctantly played what she felt was a minor role in Israel's activities. An article published by the Golda Meir institute said "she felt she was being pushed aside to a secondary arena".

However, she played a critical role in fundraising. In January 1948, the Jewish agency needed to raise funds for the continuing war and the coming Israeli state. The treasurer of the Jewish Agency was convinced that they would not be able to raise more than $7 to $8 million from the American Jewish community. Meir raised over $30 million. Key to her success was an emotional speech she first delivered in Chicago on 22 January. She toured dozens of cities in the United States and returned to Israel on 18 March.

The funds were critical to the success of the war effort and the establishment of Israel; by comparison, the opposing Arab Higher Committee's annual budget was around $2.25 million, similar to Haganah's annual budget before the war. Ben-Gurion wrote that Meir's role as the "Jewish woman who got the money which made the state possible" would go down in history.

However, upon returning home, she suffered a political setback. The Jewish Agency and National Council Executives excluded her from the 13-member cabinet of the provisional government of Israel, and only included her in the 37-member People's Council. Ben-Gurion protested this, saying "It is inconceivable that there shall be no adequate woman…it is a moral and political necessity, for the Yishuv, the Jewish world and the Arab world." At one point, he even considered offering her his spot on the cabinet.

On 13 April, she was hospitalized in Tel Aviv due to a suspected heart attack. Ben-Gurion and the political department heads urged her to guard her health and come to Jerusalem as soon as she could. They asked her to be "the mother of this city", and that her "words to 100,000 residents will be a source of blessing and encouragement". However, she felt it was a secondary and temporary role.

Instead, on 6 May, she visited Haifa after its 22 April occupation by Hagannah. This trip had a significant impact on her. There, she witnessed an elderly Arab woman emerging from a destroyed house, clutching to her few remaining belongings. When the two women made eye contact, they burst into tears. Meir went on to call the mass exodus of Arabs before the War of Independence in 1948 "dreadful", and likened it to what befall the Jews in Nazi-occupied Europe. She returned to Tel Aviv, and eventually to Jerusalem two weeks before the end of the mandate.

On 10 May, Meir had a second meeting with Abdullah I. She travelled to Amman in secret, disguised as an Arab woman. He proposed that Palestine be absorbed into Jordan, with autonomy granted to majority-Jewish areas. Golda rejected the proposal. It then seemed likely that Abdullah I would invade.

Second phase of the war and appointment to Minister Plenipotentiary 
On 14 May 1948, Meir became one of 24 signatories (including two women) of the Israeli Declaration of Independence. She later recalled, "After I signed, I cried. When I studied American history as a schoolgirl and I read about those who signed the U.S. Declaration of Independence, I couldn't imagine these were real people doing something real. And there I was sitting down and signing a declaration of establishment."

A day after independence, the second phase of the war began. Meir also suddenly lost her job and administrative responsibilities, as the Political Department became the provisional Ministry of Foreign Affairs, and her leadership role in Jerusalem was taken over by Dov Yosef.

On 18 May, she embarked on a second and even more successful fundraising tour in which she raised around $50 million. In total, her fundraising efforts raised around $90 million, around a third of the cost of the war ($275 million). During preparations for this trip, she was issued the first Israeli passport. Over the ten weeks that she was gone, Israel was battered by the war and changed drastically. 

On 25 June, while still in the United States, Meir was appointed by Sharett, then the Minister of Foreign Affairs, as the minister plenipotentiary to the Soviet Union, which recently recognized Israel.

Meir was displeased by the offer. She spoke no Russian and feared being lonely in Moscow. She said "At last we have a state. I want to be there. I don't want to go thousands of miles away. Why do I always have to go away?"

Her return to Israel was delayed due to a car crash in which she tore a ligament and fractured a bone. Soviet officials refused to believe she was in hospital and wanted an Israeli envoy as soon as possible. Thus she ignored doctor's orders to rest and returned to Israel on 29 July. Years later, her leg would frequently pain her.

Government career before premiereship

Minister Plenipotentiary to the Soviet Union (1948–1949) 

Meir served as minister plenipotentiary to the Soviet Union from 2 September 1948 to 10 March 1949.

She was reportedly impatient with diplomatic niceties and using interpreters. She did not drink or ballroom dance and had little interest in gossip and fashion. According to her interpreter, when asked by a Russian ambassador how she traveled to Moscow, she responded "tell His Excellency the Ambassador that we arrived riding on donkeys". 

This was an important and difficult role. Good relations with the Soviet Union impacted Israel's ability to secure arms from Eastern European countries. In turn, Joseph Stalin and Soviet Foreign Minister Vyacheslav Molotov saw its relationship with Israel as a means of furthering the Soviet position in the Middle East. However, Soviet–Israeli relations were complicated by Soviet policies against religious institutions and nationalist movements, made manifest in actions to shut down Jewish religious institutions as well as the ban on Hebrew language study and the prohibition of promoting emigration to Israel.

Just 20 days after her term began, antisemitic crackdowns began in response to an article by Soviet Jewish writer Ilya Ehrenburg. Meir and the other Israeli representatives responded by making a point of visiting Russian Jewish businesses, synagogues, and performances.

On 3 October, during Rosh Hashanah celebrations at the Moscow Choral Synagogue, she was mobbed by thousands of Russian Jews chanting in Yiddish "Nasha Golda", meaning "Our Golda". In her autobiography she said "I felt as though I had been caught up in a torrent of love so strong that it had literally taken my breath away and slowed down my heart." This event was commemorated by the Israeli 10,000-shekel banknote issued in November 1984. It bore a portrait of Meir on one side and the image of the crowd greeting her in Moscow on the other.

To her close friends, she admitted she had little to do in Moscow and felt isolated from Israeli politics. Despite being a socialist that was born in Ukraine, her Jewish side caused friction with the Soviets that made progress difficult. By the end of her term, she felt she had accomplished little. She reportedly felt guilty for not achieving more for the Russian Jews, as she would have been in their situation if her father had not moved to the United States. 

She planned to run for the first Knesset elections on 25 January 1949. The month before the elections, she returned to Israel and campaigned for Mapai. Mapai won 35% of the votes and formed a coalition, and Ben-Gurion invited her into the cabinet. She was sworn in on 8 March, and continued to serve in the Knesset until 1974.

Labor Minister (1949–1956) 

Ben-Gurion initially offered Meir the position of "deputy prime minister", which she rejected. She found the title and responsibilities vague, and disliked the idea of needing to coordinate with so many government departments.

Instead, she took the role of Labor Minister, which she held from 10 March 1949 to 19 June 1956. Meir enjoyed this role much more than her previous, calling it her "seven beautiful years". In particular, she enjoyed the ability to act quickly and with little friction from others. She was also one of the most powerful Israeli politicians at the time. 

The main source of friction in the role was funding, especially to deal with the millions of immigrants arriving in the new state. In October 1950, Meir announced in Washington a three-year-plan for Israel's development and stated a price tag of $15 billion over the next 15 years. The Israeli government managed to secure a loan from the United States government and American Jews that secured 40% of the budget. The newly-created Israel Bonds only provided a small amount, although years later they would contribute billions to the Israeli economy.

Meir assisted in building over a hundred ma'abarot, temporary immigrant camps with crude tin-roofed huts and tents for housing. She drew criticism from many new immigrants and contemporary politicians due to this, but responded by pointing to her limited budget and the time needed to construct proper housing. In 1953, she assisted in an effort to eliminite the ma'abarot. By 1956, two-thirds were eliminated, and 120,000 families moved to permanent housing. 

Meir considered herself highly productive during this period. She carried out welfare state policies, orchestrated the integration of immigrants into Israel's workforce, and introduced major housing and road construction projects. From 1949 to 1956, 200,000 apartments and 30,000 houses were built, large industrial and agricultural developments were initiated, and new hospitals, schools, and roads were built. Despite the complaints of her colleagues in the Finance Ministry, Meir worked to establish social security, maternity benefits, work-related accident insurance, benefits to widows and orphans, and even burial costs. 

In 1954, she sided with Ben-Gurion against Pinhas Lavon in the Lavon Affair. 

In the summer of 1955, Meir reluctantly ran for the position of mayor of Tel Aviv on request of her party. At the time, mayors were elected by the city council and not directly. She lost by the two votes of the religious bloc who withheld their support on the grounds that she was a woman. While angered by the sexism she encountered, she was happy to rejoin her colleagues in the cabinet.

On 3 August 1955, she was again hospitalized after complaining of chest pains, and was diagnosed with arrhythmia.

Foreign Minister (1956–1966) 

In October 1955, Ben-Gurion appointed Meir as foreign minister, replacing Sharett. The occasional disagreements between Ben-Gurion and Sharett had escalated to snubbing in meetings and refusals to speak face-to-face. Meir, while less experienced in foreign affairs than Sharett, had a consistently loyal and friendly relationship with Ben-Gurion. While Meir eventually came to enjoy her new job, she disliked the lingering pro-Sharett colleagues in her department.

Meir served as foreign minister from 18 June 1956 to 12 January 1966. Her first months as Foreign Minister coincided with the 1956 Suez Crisis, in which Israel, Britain, and France invaded Egypt to regain Western control over the Suez Canal, remove the President of Egypt Gamal Abdel Nasser, and secure freedom of navigation through the Straits of Tiran for Israel. Meir planned and coordinated with the French government and military prior to the start of the invasion. During United Nations debates about the crisis, Meir took charge of the Israeli delegation. After the fighting started, the United States, the Soviet Union, and the United Nations forced the three invaders to withdraw.

As foreign minister, Meir promoted ties with the newly established states in Africa in an effort to gain allies in the international community. She also believed that Israel had experience in nation-building that could be a model for the Africans. In her autobiography, she wrote:Like them, we had shaken off foreign rule; like them, we had to learn for ourselves how to reclaim the land, how to increase the yields of our crops, how to irrigate, how to raise poultry, how to live together, and how to defend ourselves. Israel could be a role model because it had been forced to find solutions to the kinds of problems that large, wealthy, powerful states had never encountered.She also devoted much effort to convincing the United States to sell Israel weaponry. One success in this area came in 1962, when the White House quietly agreed to sell Hawk missiles to Israel. Israel's relationship with the Soviet Union remained frosty during her tenure.

On 29 October 1957, Meir's foot was slightly injured when a Mills bomb was thrown into the debating chamber of the Knesset. David Ben-Gurion and Moshe Carmel were more seriously injured. The attack was carried out by 25-year-old Moshe Dwek. Born in Aleppo, his motives were attributed to a dispute with the Jewish Agency, but he was described as being "mentally unbalanced".

In 1958, Meir praised Pope Pius XII's assistance of the Jewish people shortly after his death. The pontiff's legacy as a wartime pope has continued to be controversial into the 21st century.

The same year, during the wave of Jewish migration from Poland to Israel, Meir sought to prevent disabled and sick Polish Jews from immigrating to Israel. In a letter sent to Israel's ambassador in Warsaw, Katriel Katz, she wrote:
A proposal was raised in the coordination committee to inform the Polish government that we want to institute selection in aliyah, because we cannot continue accepting sick and handicapped people. Please give your opinion as to whether this can be explained to the Poles without hurting immigration."

In late 1965, 67-year-old Meir was diagnosed with lymphoma. In January 1966, she retired from her role as Foreign Minister, citing exhaustion and ill health, although she continued to serve in the Knesset and as secretary-general of Mapai.

Premiership (1969–1974) 

Prime Minister Levi Eshkol died suddenly on 26 February 1969, leading to the appointment of Yigal Allon as interim prime minister and an election to replace him. Upon being informed of his death, Meir said "Oy Gevald". Before the vote, most suspected that Meir would be elected. 71-year-old Meir had mixed feelings about serving, due to her health concerns. On 7 March 1969, the party's central committee voted Meir as the new party leader. She eventually agreed, saying that she would honor the party's decision, just as she had honored all of the party's past decisions.

Meir served as prime minister from 17 March 1969 to 3 June 1974. She maintained the national unity government formed in 1967 after the Six-Day War, in which Mapai merged with two other parties (Rafi and Ahdut HaAvoda) to form the Israeli Labor Party. In June 1969, on the two-year anniversary of the war, Meir stated in an interview that there was no such thing as Palestinians, a comment later described as "one of her defining – and most damning – legacies." 

Six months after taking office, Meir led the reconfigured Alignment, comprising Labor and Mapam, into the 1969 general election. The Alignment managed what is still the best showing for a single party or faction in Israeli history, winning 56 seats. This is the only time that a party or faction has approached winning an outright majority in an election. The national unity government was retained.

In 1969 and the early 1970s, Meir met with many world leaders to promote her vision of peace in the Middle East, including Richard Nixon (1969), Nicolae Ceaușescu (1972) and Pope Paul VI (1973). In 1973, she hosted the chancellor of West Germany, Willy Brandt, in Israel.

In August 1970, Meir accepted a U.S. peace initiative that called for an end to the War of Attrition and an Israeli pledge to withdraw to "secure and recognized boundaries" in the framework of a comprehensive peace settlement. The Gahal party quit the national unity government in protest, but Meir continued to lead the remaining coalition.

On February 28, 1973, during a visit in Washington, D.C., Meir agreed with Henry Kissinger's peace proposal based on "security versus sovereignty": Israel would accept Egyptian sovereignty over all Sinai, while Egypt would accept Israeli presence in some of Sinai's strategic positions.

Munich Olympics (1972)

In the wake of the Munich massacre at the 1972 Summer Olympics, Meir appealed to the world to "save our citizens and condemn the unspeakable criminal acts committed". Outraged at the perceived lack of global action, she ordered the Mossad to hunt down and assassinate suspected leaders and operatives of Black September and the PFLP.

Dispute with Austria (1973)
During the 1970s, about 200,000 Soviet Jewish emigrants were allowed to leave the Soviet Union for Israel by way of Austria. When seven of these emigrants were taken hostage at the Austria–Czechoslovakia border by Palestinian militants in September 1973, the Chancellor of Austria, Bruno Kreisky, closed the Jewish Agency's transit facility in Schönau, Austria. A few days later in Vienna, Meir tried to convince Kreisky to reopen the facility by appealing to his own Jewish origin, and described his position as "succumbing to terrorist blackmail". Kreisky did not change his position, so Meir returned to Israel, infuriated. A few months later, Austria opened a new transition camp.

Yom Kippur War (1973)

As the nation's leader during this short war, her main goal was deciding on the timing of preliminary operations, and providing the IDF with the necessary time and munitions to pull off a victory. In the days leading up to the Yom Kippur War, Israeli intelligence could not conclusively determine that an attack was imminent. However, on 5 October 1973, Meir received official news that Syrian forces were massing on the Golan Heights. She was alarmed by the reports, and believed that the situation was similar to what preceded the Six-Day War. However, her advisers assured her not to worry, saying that they would have adequate notice before a war broke out. This made sense at the time; after the Six-Day War, most Israelis felt it unlikely that the Arabs would attack. Consequently, although the Knesset passed a resolution granting her power to demand a full-scale call-up of the military (instead of the typical cabinet decision), Meir did not mobilize Israel's forces early. Soon, though, the threat of war became very clear. Six hours before the outbreak of hostilities, Meir met with Minister of Defense Moshe Dayan and General David Elazar. While Dayan continued to argue that war was unlikely and favored calling up the air force and only two divisions, Elazar advocated full-scale army mobilization and the launch of a full-scale preemptive strike on Syrian forces.

On October 6, Meir approved full-scale mobilizing but rejected a preemptive strike, citing concerns that Israel may be perceived as initiating hostilities, which would hurt Israel's access to crucial foreign aid and military support especially from the United States in the resulting conflict. She made it a priority to inform Washington of her decision. U.S. Secretary of State Henry Kissinger later confirmed Meir's assessment by stating that if Israel had launched a preemptive strike, Israel would not have received "so much as a nail".

Resignation (1974)

Following the Yom Kippur War, Meir's government was plagued by infighting and questions over Israel's lack of preparation for the war. The Agranat Commission appointed to investigate the war cleared Meir of "direct responsibility". It said about her actions on Yom Kippur morning:

Her party won the elections in December 1973, but the coalition lost seats and was unable to form a majority.  Meir announced her resignation as Prime Minister on 11 April 1974, and resigned from the Knesset on 7 June 1974.  She never held office again. She believed that was the "will of the people" and that she had served enough time as premier. She believed the government needed to form a coalition. She said, "Five years are sufficient  ... It is beyond my strength to continue carrying this burden." Yitzhak Rabin succeeded her on June 3, 1974.

After premiereship and death (1974–1978) 
In 1975, Meir published her autobiography, My Life, which became a New York Times Best Seller.

On 21 November 1977, Meir spoke at the Knesset on behalf of the Labor Party to Egyptian President Anwar Sadat during his historic trip as the first Arab leader to visit Israel. She said his visit was important for the sake of the next generations' avoiding war, praised Sadat for his courage and vision, and expressed the hope that while many differences remained to be resolved, that vision would be achieved in a spirit of mutual understanding.

On 8 December 1978, Meir died of lymphatic cancer in Jerusalem at the age of 80. She was buried on Mount Herzl in Jerusalem.

Personal life 

Meir's husband Morris Meyerson (also "Myerson") was born on 17 December 1893 in Chicago, Illinois. They married on December 24, 1917, and remained married until his death in Jerusalem on 25 May 1951. She never remarried. Despite never divorcing, the couple grew apart over the course of the marriage. When Meir took her children with her to the United States in the 1930s, Morris stayed behind in Jerusalem. 

Meir had two children. Her son, Menachem, was born on 1924 in Jerusalem and died on 14 December 2014 in Tel Aviv. He was a professional cellist who studied at the Israel Conservatory and Manhattan School of Music. Her daughter Sarah was born on 17 May 1926 and died on 30 January 2010 in Revivim. 

She had two sisters, Sheyna (1889–1972) and Tzipke (1902–1981), as well as five other siblings who died in childhood.

In 1956, after becoming Foreign Minister, she changed her surname from "Meyerson" to "Meir", meaning "illuminate", as her predecessor Moshe Sharett had all members of the foreign service take a Hebrew surname.

She was a heavy smoker, drinker of coffee, and did not exercise often, which may have contributed to her recurring heart problems.

Of her Jewish identity, Meir said in the 1975 edition of her autobiography My Life that:It is not only a matter, I believe, of religious observance and practice. To me, being Jewish means and has always meant being proud to be part of a people that has maintained its distinct identity for more than 2,000 years, with all the pain and torment that has been inflicted upon it.

She strongly identified with Judaism culturally, but was an atheist in religious belief. She is famously reported to have stated: "I believe in the Jewish people, and the Jewish people believe in God."

Awards and recognition
In 1974, Meir was awarded the honor of World Mother by American Mothers.
In 1974 Meir was awarded the James Madison Award for Distinguished Public Service by Princeton University's American Whig–Cliosophic Society.

In 1975, Meir was awarded the Israel Prize for her special contribution to society and the State of Israel.

In 1985, Meir was inducted into the Colorado Women's Hall of Fame.

Legacy
Biographer Meron Medzini argues that a perspective of forty years makes possible an appreciation of her deep nationalism and Zionism. Historians find her main legacy includes effective leadership of the Labor Movement, and building good relationships with Third World nations.  Medzini states, "Apart from laying the foundations for Israel’s presence in Africa, she was never taken with the routine and often dull diplomatic work in the Foreign Ministry and abhorred its outer manifestations of ceremonies and rites." Most historians agree she was a success as  Secretary of Labor and Housing, but a failure  as prime minister.

Portrayals in film and theater

Meir's story has been the subject of many fictionalized portrayals. In 1977, Anne Bancroft played Meir in William Gibson's Broadway play Golda. The Australian actress Judy Davis played a young Meir in the television film A Woman Called Golda (1982), opposite Leonard Nimoy. Ingrid Bergman played the older Meir in the same film. Actress Colleen Dewhurst portrayed Meir in the 1986 TV movie Sword of Gideon.

In 2003, American Jewish actress Tovah Feldshuh portrayed her on Broadway in Golda's Balcony, Gibson's second play about Meir's life. The play was controversial for implying that Meir considered using nuclear weapons during the Yom Kippur War. Valerie Harper portrayed Meir in the touring company production and in the film version of Golda's Balcony. In 2005, actress Lynn Cohen portrayed Meir in Steven Spielberg's film Munich.

Tovah Feldshuh assumed the role of Meir again in the 2006 English-language French movie O Jerusalem. She was played by the Polish actress Beata Fudalej in the 2009 dramatic film The Hope directed by Márta Mészáros.

Actress Helen Mirren portrayed Meir in the Golda biopic film directed by Guy Nattiv and produced by Michael Kuhn. The film centres on the Yom Kippur War.

The upcoming TV mini-series Lioness starring Shira Haas is also currently being produced and will be directed by Barbra Streisand.

Commemoration

 Golda Meir House Museum and Education Center, Auraria Campus, 1149 9t Street, Denver CO 80204 
 Golda Meir School, Milwaukee, Wisconsin
 Golda Meir School, in Barra da Tijuca, Rio de Janeiro, Brazil
 Golda Meir Library, University of Wisconsin–Milwaukee, Wisconsin
 Golda Meir Boulevard, Jerusalem, Israel (and various other streets, neighborhoods and schools in Israel)
 Golda Meir Center for the Performing Arts – home to the Israeli Opera and the Cameri Theater, Tel Aviv
 Bust of Golda Meir at Golda Meir Square, New York City
 Golda Meir Center for Political Leadership at Metropolitan State University of Denver
 Golda Meir House, Denver, Colorado
 Golda Meir House, Newton, Massachusetts
 Golda Meir Street in the city of Kyiv

Cultural references
In Israel, the term "Golda's shoes" (na'alei Golda) has become a reference to the sturdy orthopedic shoes that Golda favored. These shoes were also supplied to women soldiers in the Israel Defense Forces from its foundation to 1987.

Published works
 This Is Our Strength (1962) – Golda Meir's collected papers
 My Father's House (1972)
 My Life (1975). Putnam, .

See also
 Évian Conference
 List of Israel Prize recipients

Notes

References

Sources
 
 
 Medzini,  Meron. "Golda Meir–A Forty Year Perspective." Israel Studies 23.1 (2018): 73-85. online

Further reading
 
Bachleitner, Kathrin. "Golda Meir and Bruno Kreisky–A Political and Personal Duel." Israel Studies 23.1 (2018): 26-49. online; in 1973 she clashed with leader of Austria regarding Palestinian terrorist attacks against Jewish transit through Vienna.
 
 , a standard scholarly biography; excerpt
 Lahav, Pnina. "“A Great Episode in the History of Jewish Womanhood”: Golda Meir, the Women Workers' Council, Pioneer Women, and the Struggle for Gender Equality." Israel Studies 23.1 (2018): 1-25. online
 , popular online
 
 Medzini, Meron. Golda Meir: A Political Biography (2017) excerpt; a stamdard scholarly biography
 Medzini, Meron. Golda Meir: A Reference Guide to Her Life and Works (2020) excerpt
 Skard, Torild (2014) "Golda Meir" in Women of Power – Half a century of female presidents and prime ministers worldwide. Bristol: Policy Press, .
 Steinberg, Blema S. Women in power: The personalities and leadership styles of Indira Gandhi, Golda Meir, and Margaret Thatcher (McGill-Queen's Press-MQUP, 2008).
 , highly flattering
 
 Tsoref, Hagai. "Golda Meir's Leadership in the Yom Kippur War." Israel Studies 23.1 (2018): 50-72. online
 Weitz, Yechiam. "Golda Meir, Israel's Fourth Prime Minister (1969–74)." Middle Eastern Studies 47.1 (2011): 43-61. online

Historiography
 Schmidt, Sarah. "Hagiography in the diaspora: Golda Meir and her biographers." American Jewish History 92.2 (2004): 157-188. online

External links

 
 Golda Meir at the Israeli Ministry of Foreign Affairs
 Meir, Golda (née Mabovitch; 1898–1978) at the Jewish Agency For Israel
 Women's International Center
 
 
 Video Lecture on Golda Meir by Dr. Henry Abramson
Prime Minister Golda Meir, Exhibition in the IDF&Defense establishment archives 
 Golda Meir Personal Manuscripts, Shapell Manuscript Foundation
 The Golda Meir Mount Carmel International Training Center (MCTC) – established in 1961 to assist in the training of women engaged in community work in the newly emerging states in Africa and Asia

|-

|-

|-

 
1898 births
1978 deaths
20th-century American educators
20th-century American politicians
20th-century American women politicians
20th-century atheists
20th-century Israeli women politicians
20th-century women rulers
Alignment (Israel) leaders
Ambassadors of Israel to the Soviet Union
American atheists
American emigrants to Mandatory Palestine
American Ashkenazi Jews
American Zionists
Asian democratic socialists
Burials at Mount Herzl
Deaths from cancer in Israel
Deaths from lymphoma
Emigrants from the Russian Empire to the United States
Female foreign ministers
Female interior ministers
Histadrut
Israel Prize for special contribution to society and the State recipients
Israel Prize women recipients
Israeli atheists
Israeli autobiographers
Israeli Ashkenazi Jews
Israeli Labor Party leaders
Israeli people of American-Jewish descent
Israeli people of Russian-Jewish descent
Israeli people of Ukrainian-Jewish descent
Israeli people of the Yom Kippur War
Israeli women diplomats
Jewish American politicians
Jewish atheists
Jewish Israeli politicians
Jewish National Council members
Jewish women politicians
Jews from the Russian Empire
Kibbutzniks
Mapai politicians
Members of the Assembly of Representatives (Mandatory Palestine)
Members of the 1st Knesset (1949–1951)
Members of the 2nd Knesset (1951–1955)
Members of the 3rd Knesset (1955–1959)
Members of the 4th Knesset (1959–1961)
Members of the 5th Knesset (1961–1965)
Members of the 6th Knesset (1965–1969)
Members of the 7th Knesset (1969–1974)
Members of the 8th Knesset (1974–1977)
Ministers of Foreign Affairs of Israel
Ministers of Internal Affairs of Israel
North Division High School (Milwaukee) alumni
Order of the Quetzal
Politicians from Kyiv
Politicians from Milwaukee
Prime Ministers of Israel
Recipients of the Order of José Matías Delgado
Schoolteachers from Wisconsin
Signatories of the Israeli Declaration of Independence
Ukrainian Jews
University of Wisconsin–Milwaukee alumni
Wisconsin socialists
Israeli women ambassadors
Women autobiographers
Women government ministers of Israel
Women members of the Knesset
Women prime ministers
Yiddish-speaking people
Jewish women activists